is a railway station in the city of Ashikaga, Tochigi, Japan, operated by the East Japan Railway Company (JR East).

Lines
Omata Station is served by the Ryōmō Line, and is located 47.3 km from the terminus of the line at Oyama Station.

Station layout
Omata Station has a single island platform connected to the station building by a footbridge. The station is unattended.

Platforms

History
The station opened on 10 October 1889. With the privatization of JNR on 1 April 1987, the station came under the control of JR East.

Surrounding area
 Watarase River
Ashikaga Omata Post Office

See also
 List of railway stations in Japan

External links

 JR East station information 

Stations of East Japan Railway Company
Railway stations in Tochigi Prefecture
Ryōmō Line
Railway stations in Japan opened in 1889
Ashikaga, Tochigi